Zhang Tianhan (born October 22, 1987) is a versatile Chinese football player who currently plays for China League One side Kunshan FC.

Club career
Originally starting his professional football career at Qingdao Jonoon Zhang Tianhan would be unable to establish himself with the senior squad. In the 2008 league season Changchun Yatai were willing to take the young player into their squad, he would then go on to make his debut for the club in a league game against Beijing Guoan F.C. on October 22, 2008 where he came on as a substitute in a 2-1 defeat. By the end of the season he would show signs of development when he made a total of eight league appearances for them in his debut campaign, however this was the height of his career with the club and by the end of the 2011 season he was allowed to leave the club.

Without a club Zhang retired from football at only 24 years old and started a business selling shoes. After three years the company would financially struggle in 2015 and Zhang would look to return to football with amateur teams Shenzhen Yisheng and Zhaoqing Hengtai where he was paid 1000 Yuan per appearance. In the 2017 China Amateur Football League season Zhang would gain promotion to the Chinese third tier with Anhui Hefei Guiguan before joining Kunshan FC who he was able to gain promotion with them to the second tier at the end of the 2019 China League Two season.

Career statistics 
.

References

External links
 Player profile at csldata.sports.sohu.com
 Player profile at hudong.com

1987 births
Living people
Footballers from Shenyang
Chinese footballers
Qingdao Hainiu F.C. (1990) players
Changchun Yatai F.C. players
Kunshan F.C. players
China League Two players
Chinese Super League players
Association football defenders
Association football midfielders